Dan Caslar (1888–1959) was an Italian composer. He worked on several film scores. He developed a reputation as a composer of jazz.

Selected filmography
 Five to Nil (1932)
 Three Lucky Fools (1933)
 Lucky Night (1941)
 A Husband for the Month of April (1941)
 The Happy Ghost (1941)
 A Living Statue (1943)
 Night Taxi (1950)

References

Bibliography
 Goffredo Plastino & Joseph Sciorra. Neapolitan Postcards: The Canzone Napoletana as Transnational Subject. Scarecrow Press, 2016.

External links

1888 births
1959 deaths
Italian composers
Musicians from Naples